Nevada Township may refer to:

Nevada Township, Livingston County, Illinois
Nevada Township, Palo Alto County, Iowa
Nevada Township, Minnesota

See also
Nevada (disambiguation)